Maltio Strict Nature Reserve (Maltion luonnonpuisto) is a strict nature reserve located in Lapland, Finland. It has been used f.e. to study the relation of reindeers and predators. At Maltio is lot of bird species.

Protected areas of the Arctic
Strict nature reserves of Finland
Geography of Lapland (Finland)
Savukoski